"Da vidna" is a song performed by Belarusian band VAL.

Eurovision Song Contest

The song was to have represented Belarus in the Eurovision Song Contest 2020, after VAL was selected through the Belarus national selection. On 28 January 2020, a special allocation draw was held which placed each country into one of the two semi-finals, as well as which half of the show they would perform in. Belarus was placed into the first semi-final, to be held on 12 May 2020, and was scheduled to perform in the first half of the show.

References

2020 singles
2020 songs
Eurovision songs of 2020
Eurovision songs of Belarus